The men's 30 kilometre freestyle at the 2007 Asian Winter Games was held on January 31, 2007 at Beida Lake Skiing Resort, China.

Schedule
All times are China Standard Time (UTC+08:00)

Results
Legend
DNF — Did not finish

 Katsuhito Ebisawa was awarded bronze because of no three-medal sweep per country rule.

References

Results FIS

External links
Results of the Fifth Winter Asian Games

Men 30